Saltney is a cross-border town, split between Flintshire, Wales and Cheshire, England. The town is intersected by the England–Wales border, with its larger part being a community of Wales in the historic county of Clwyd. The town forms part of Chester's built-up area and is around 5 miles from Deeside.

Saltney is located next to the River Dee. In the 2001 census the population of the town was 4,769,  rising to 5,132 at the time of the 2011 census.

Location
Higher Saltney, known locally as "Top Saltney" is in Chester, Cheshire. The Welsh sector of the community is known as Saltney. 
The England–Wales border runs down the middle of Boundary Lane, the only urban street in England and Wales where this happens. Houses on the west side of the street are in the Flintshire County Council area and in the North Wales Police jurisdiction, while those on the east side are in the Cheshire West and Chester unitary authority area and in the Cheshire Police jurisdiction.   in terms of policing, this refers to operations jurisdiction not legal jurisdiction. Officers from both forces have full legal jurisdiction throughout England & Wales therefore the border is largely immaterial for practical purposes.
The west side is in the Alyn and Deeside parliamentary constituency and the east is in the City of Chester electoral division.

History
Saltney's name is derived from the former salt marshes by the River Dee on which it is built. Once the terminus of Sir John Glynne's Canal, Saltney grew in the late nineteenth century and through the twentieth century to its present population of over 5,000. Saltney Ferry railway station was open between 1891 and 1962.

Saltney was a location for shipbuilding and in particular chain-making and the manufacture of anchors. The firm Henry Wood & Company was first to establish an engineering works on the west bank of the Dee in 1847, with further industrial development continuing into the 1880s. 
Henry Wood's legacy is implemented with Wood Memorial CP School being named after him.

Amenities
There is a public house called The City Arms in Higher Saltney. Hanging outside was a sign "The Last Pub In England" and on the other side it read "The First Pub In England". This sign was taken down some years ago. Other amenities in Saltney include the Corner Pin public house, a post office, Saltney Business Centre, St David's Retail Park and the Asda and Morrisons supermarkets.

Saltney has three primary schools, St Anthony's Catholic Primary, Saltney Ferry C.P. and Wood Memorial. St David's High School is the local secondary school for students from the surrounding areas.

The Anglican parish church is St Mark's which is in Higher Saltney. On the High Street can be found St Anthony of Padua Catholic Church and Saltney Methodist Church.

There is a community centre in the centre of Saltney which is regularly used by children's groups as well as being surrounded by fields where football tournaments are often held. The Community Centre is also home to Saltney Town FC who formed in 2010.

Notable people 
 Stephen Dewar Holden (1870–1918), engineer, locomotive superintendent of the Great Eastern Railway, 1908-1912.
 Charles Sitch (1887–1960,) politician and MP for Kingswinford, 1918-1931.
 Arthur Pearson (1897–1980), politician and MP for Pontypridd, 1938-1970
 Ted Regan (1900 – ??), footballer with 188 caps with Wrexham A.F.C.
 Melanie Roberts (born 1988), retired artistic gymnast.

See also
St Matthew's Church, Saltney
Sealand, Flintshire, a nearby area of farmland reclaimed from the Dee estuary.
Chester Corporation Tramways former tramway to Chester station

References

External links 

Photos of Saltney and surrounding area on geograph.org.uk

Towns in Flintshire
Towns in Cheshire
Towns of the Welsh Marches
England–Wales border
Areas of Chester